Club Deportivo Ocotal is a Nicaraguan football team playing at the top level. They are located in Ocotal near to the Honduras border.

Achievements
 Segunda División de Nicaragua and predecessors 
 Champions (1): 2016–2017

Rivalries

Clásico de las Segovias 
The club's nearest neighbour is Real Madriz from Somoto, a rivalry being shared between fans of both football teams.

Current squad

Personnel

Current technical staff

Management

List of Managers
Ocotal has had permanent managers since it first appointed Randal Moreno as coach in 2003. The longest serving manager was Randall Moreno, who managed Ocotal for three years from 2003 to Jan 2005. Panamanian Carlos Walcott was the foreign coach in the club.

Jersey sponsors
claro

External links
 Home page of Deportivo Ocotal (In Spanish)
 FACEBOOK

 
Football clubs in Nicaragua
Association football clubs established in 2002
2002 establishments in Nicaragua